Ronald Murray Berndt (14 July 1916 – 2 May 1990) was an Australian social anthropologist who, in 1963, became the inaugural professor of anthropology at the University of Western Australia.

He and his wife Catherine Berndt maintained a close professional partnership for five decades, working among Aboriginal Australians at Ooldea (1941), Northern Territory cattle stations (194446), Balgo (195781) and natives of New Guinea (195153).

Early life and education
Berndt was born in 1916 in Adelaide. He attended high school at Pulteney Grammar School. He graduated from the University of Sydney in 1951 with a Bachelor of Arts, following up with a Master of Arts in 1954. He was awarded a PhD for a thesis based on his anthropological work in New Guinea.

Aboriginal land rights
Berndt was an early advocate for legal recognition and protection of Aboriginal sacred sites, and clashed in 1980 with the Liberal premier Sir Charles Court over the Noonkanbah dispute in the Kimberley region.

His interest was much broader than any one specific location or event, and he was focused on the national dimensions of the land rights issue.

Publications
Some of his sole authored monographs include Kunapipi (1951), Djanggawul (1952), and Man, land and myth in Northern Australia (1970).

Joint works with Catherine Berndt
The Berndts jointly wrote a book first in 1952 as The First Australians which went into three editions—the last being published in 1974. A similar title The World of the First Australians went into five editions.

Their publications were extensive. Their contribution to the 1979 Sesquicentenary of Western Australia was the book Aborigines of the West.

Legacy
The collected essays in honour of the Berndts in 1990 showed the breadth of the influence of their teaching and writings, with essays by a wide spectrum of anthropologists of their time, including Claude Levi-Strauss and Raymond Firth.

The Berndts were avid collectors, and their collection was bequeathed to the University of Western Australia and exists as the Berndt Museum of Anthropology.

See also
Dzamalag

References

1916 births
1990 deaths
Australian anthropologists
Alumni of the University of London
University of Sydney alumni
Academic staff of the University of Western Australia
Writers from Adelaide
20th-century anthropologists
20th-century Australian male writers
20th-century Australian non-fiction writers
Academic journal editors
Burials at Karrakatta Cemetery